Pyropteron minianiforme is a moth of the family Sesiidae. It is found on the Balkan Peninsula, Crete, Cyprus and in Ukraine. It is also found in Turkey, the Caucasus, the Black Sea region and the Kopet-Dagh.

The wingspan is about 18 mm.

The larvae feed on Rumex acetosa, Rumex palustris, Rumex hydrolapathum, Rumex pulcher, Rumex conglomeratus, Rumex crispus and Rumex maritimus.

Subspecies
Pyropteron minianiforme minianiforme
Pyropteron minianiforme destitutum (Staudinger, 1894)
Pyropteron minianiforme aphrodite Bartsch, 2004

References

External links
Lepiforum.de

Moths described in 1843
Sesiidae
Moths of Europe
Moths of Asia
Taxa named by Christian Friedrich Freyer